The 2010 World Mixed Doubles Curling Championship was held in Chelyabinsk, Russia from April 18–24, 2010. The event was held in conjunction with the 2010 World Senior Curling Championships. Many of the teams faced delays or withdrew from the championship due to the air travel disruption after the 2010 Eyjafjallajökull eruption.

Teams

Not Competing
The following teams were initially listed as participating in this event but are not included on the most recently updated schedule.

Competition Status following the Icelandic volcano incident

The following teams officially withdrew from the Championship due to the Icelandic volcano incident.

The following teams were delayed by the Icelandic volcano incident but still were able to make it to the Championship. Because these teams were delayed, the draws they were scheduled to play in were postponed until they arrived in Chelyabinsk.

Round robin

Results

All draw times are listed in Yekaterinburg Time (UTC+05).

Blue group

April 18
Draw 2
13:00

April 19
Draw 4
09:00

Draw 6
17:00

April 20
Draw 8
13:00

April 21
Draw 11
13:00

Draw 12
17:00

April 22
Draw 14
13:00

Draw 15
17:00

Red group

April 18
Draw 2
13:00

April 19
Draw 4
09:00

Draw 5
13:00

April 20
Draw 7
09:00

Draw 9
17:00

April 21
Draw 11
13:00

April 22
Draw 13
09:00

Draw 14
13:00

Draw 15
17:00

Green group

April 18
Draw 1
09:00

Draw 3
17:00

April 19
Draw 5
13:00

Draw 6
17:00

April 20
Draw 7
09:00

Draw 8
13:00

Draw 9
17:00

April 21
Draw 10
09:00

Draw 12
17:00

April 22
Draw 13
09:00

Draw 15
17:00

Tie-breaker
Friday, April 23, 08:30

Friday, April 23, 11:30

Playoffs

Qualification Game
Friday, April 23, 15:30

Quarterfinals
Friday, April 23, 19:30

Semifinals
Saturday, April 24, 9:00

Bronze-medal game
Saturday, April 24, 14:00

Gold-medal game
Saturday, April 24, 14:00

References
General

Specific

World Mixed Doubles Curling Championship, 2010
World Mixed Doubles Curling Championship
2010 in Russian sport
International curling competitions hosted by Russia